Paombong, officially the Municipality of Paombong,  is a 3rd class municipality in the province of Bulacan, Philippines. According to the 2020 census, it has a population of 55,696 people.

Dubbed as the "Vinegar Capital of the Philippines", Paombong is famous for its vinegar extracted from the sap of sasa (nipa), thus the term "Sukang Paombong" (Paombong vinegar) became known in Luzon and other parts of the Philippines.

Etymology

Local legend has it that the name "Paombong" was taken from the long bamboo tube called "bumbong" or "tukil" which is used for collecting nipa sap. The practice of extracting nipa sap with bumbongs made the town known as the town with many bumbongs.

The local people claimed that the Spaniards who first visited the place were so amused with the bumbong that, after learning its name from the natives, they named the town after the container, a name which later evolved to Paombong.

History
Paombong was originally one of the visitas (barrio) of Malolos mentioned in Capitulo XXXVI of Conquistas de Las Islas libro segundo by Fray Gaspar San Agustin. In a meeting held in Tondo Convent, the Provincial Chapter created the Town of Malolos in June 1580 with Fray Matheo de Mendoza OSA as its first minister, together with Barrios of Mambog under the patronage of San Roque,Matimbo with Santa Cruz and Paombong with Saint James Apostle. In 1619 Augustinians already established Paombong Convent but the town was administered by the justice of friars from Malolos. Paombong is not wealthy as its neighbor towns of Malolos and Hagonoy at time and it did not sustain its township and it was degraded again as barrio and being a visita in 1638.

In 1639 Paombong was turned over to the Town of Calumpit from its mother town Malolos and in 1649 it was returned again to Malolos but on November 28, 1650, it was finally given its own civil government establishing Paombong its full township with Don Agustin Mananghaya as its first Gobernadorcillo.

In the middle of the 1750s, Paombong grew into a modest community from what was once a cogon land inhabited by a handful of Tagalogs. as its first gobernadorcillo.

During the Revolution against Spain, Paombong's coastal area, more specifically, Barangays Masukol and Binakod, played a significant role in Philippine History being known encounter sites between Spanish soldiers and Katipuneros. Maloleño General Isidoro "matanglawin" Torres used to retreat with his troops to Barangay Masukol and Barangay Binakod to avoid the advancing Spanish forces. In the latter village, he organized the Katipunan militia of Paombong.

It is from these encounters, in fact, that Barangays Binakod and Masukol earned their present names. In one encounter, Binakod was where the enemies where "fenced in" (binakuran) and it was in Masukol where they were eventually "cornered" (nasukol) and defeated.

In 1898, the first civilian in the person of Don Victorio de Leon headed the Municipal Government until 1900. The seat of the local government was first established at the ground floor of the Paombong Church Convent then popularly called "zaguan". It was later transferred to the house of Numerino Lindayag located in Poblacion, then was transferred to the location of the present Rural Health Center I. Eventually it was moved to the place where it is presently located which since has been the seat of the Municipal Government since then. In 1941, the head of the Municipal Government was later on called Municipal Mayor.

Geography

Paombong is situated south-west of the province of Bulacan, with a total land area of 46.34 square kilometers. It is bounded by the municipality of Calumpit on the north, Malolos City on the east, municipality of Hagonoy on the west and Manila Bay on the south. The municipality is approximately 47 kilometers from Metro Manila, it is a by-pass town and can be accessed via North Luzon Expressway and MacArthur Highway.

Barangays

Paombong is politically subdivided into 14 barangays (6 urban, 8 rural):

 Binakod - This barangay is known for producing rock salt. 
 Kapitangan - This barangay is a famous pilgrimage site during the Holy Week, particularly Good Friday. Some devout Catholic worshippers flagellate and/or allow themselves to be crucified to repent and share in the sufferings of Jesus Christ.
 Malumot
 Masukol
 Pinalagdan
 Poblacion
 San Isidro I
 San Isidro II
 San Jose - cradle the largest "sasahan" in town, subdivided into 7 political sitio or "purok" (Sitio Uno, Gitna, Sitio Tres, Sitio Wawa, Sitio Pantay, Sito Gunao and Sitio Kulis ). It is also a political hot spot every election for National and Local Positions. The San Jose Fishport located at Sitio Wawa cradles the motor boats or "bangka" which serves as the major transportation going to the three barangays near Manila Bay, namely, Santa Cruz, Masukol and Binakod.
 San Roque
 San Vicente
 Santa Cruz - There are 2 main resources of this barangay, fishponds and "asinan" or salt making. In this coastal barangay you can see some salt evaporation ponds.
 Santo Niño - Formerly known as "Tulay na Bato" because it is the only place then that has a concrete bridge. This is the frontier barangay of Paombong.
 Santo Rosario

Climate

Demographics

Economy 

Major Industries
 Aquaculture                 (Culturing of Milk Fish, Tilapia, Shrimps, Oysters, King Crab & others)
 Ornamental Plants/Flowers   (Used for gardening and landscaping)
 Grass Planting              (Carabao Grass, Bermuda Grass, Blue Grass etc. - Used for Gardening & Landscaping)
 Garments
 Food Processing             (Smoked Fish and other food products)

Major Products
 Condiments                  (Vinegar, Fish Sauce, Salts, et al.)
 Nipa                        (Weaving of Nipa Palm Leaves)
 Agricultural Products       (Rice, Poultry, Livestocks, Fisheries, Fruits and Vegetables)

Tourism
 St. James the Apostle Parish Church: The town church of Paombong originally built as visita of Malolos in 1580, established as parish in 1639 made of light materials. It suffered a massive fire causing it to lost its ancient architecture. It was reconstructed in the 1970s and reconstructed again in 2003,
 Ciudad Clementino, the prime resort of the small town was the venue of Sa Sandaling Kailangan Mo Ako miniseries.
 Kapitangan Good Friday Crucifixion: International media focuses every Good Friday on the Crucifixion at Barangay Kapitangan. It is known as a pilgrimage area,  spiritual healers' haven and venue of a reenactment of the Passion of Christ is held by local devotees and penitents.

Transportation
Public land transport in Paombong is served by provincial buses, Jeepneys, for-hire Tricycles, Pedicabs, and UV Express AUVs. Maritime transport is served by motorboats. Both First North Luzon Transit and Baliwag Transit buses passes thru the municipality.

Healthcare

There is one hospital operating in Paombong and a main rural health care center unit. The San Pascual Baylon Maternity Hospital, situated at Barangay Santo Niño that offers secondary healthcare services. And the main rural health care center is one of the district rural health center owned and controlled by the Provincial Government of Bulacan. It offers primary healthcare services which also includes laboratory and dental and maternity services.

Government

Just as the national government, the municipal government is divided into three branches: executive, legislative and judiciary. The judicial branch is administered solely by the Supreme Court of the Philippines. The LGUs have control of the executive and legislative branch.

The executive branch is composed of the mayor and the barangay captain for the barangays. The legislative branch is composed of the Sangguniang Bayan (town assembly), Sangguniang Barangay (barangay council), and the Sangguniang Kabataan for the youth sector.

The seat of Government is vested upon the Mayor and other elected officers who hold office at the Town hall. The Sanguniang Bayan is the center of legislation.

Municipal officials 

The following officials were elected on May 9, 2022, to serve a three-year term.

Mayor: Maryanne "Ann" P. Marcos (PDP-Laban)
Vice Mayor: Emelita B. Yunson (Independent)

Councilors
  Alfredo "JC" B. Castro Jr. (Independent) 
  John Raymond A. Marcaida (NUP)
  Paulo Mari "Pao" S. de Jesus (Independent)
  Gian Carlo G. Valencia (PDP-Laban)
  Judith Z. Bartolome (PDP-Laban)
  Marcelo "Marcy" D. Ong III (PDP-Laban)
  Philip L. Eusebio (PDP-Laban)
  Marcelino "Marcing" R. de Roxas (NUP)

Education

Private schools
 Binuya's Kiddie School
 St. Martin de Porres Catholic School
 Paombong High School, Inc.
 Holy Rosary School of Paombong

Public schools
Elementary Schools

High Schools
 Kapitangan National High School
 Pinalagdan High School
 San Roque National High School
 Santa Cruz National High School

Gallery

References

External links

 [ Philippine Standard Geographic Code]
Philippine Census Information

Municipalities of Bulacan
Populated places on Manila Bay